Boda Union is a union parishad of Boda Upazila, in Panchagarh District, Rangpur Division of Bangladesh. There are 23 villages and 13 mouzas in the union.

References

External links
 

Unions of Boda Upazila
Unions of Panchagarh District
Unions of Rangpur Division